Ooni Okiti was the 32nd Ooni of Ife, a paramount traditional ruler of Ile Ife, a Nigerian town that is the ancestral home of the Yorubas.  He succeeded Ooni Olojo and was succeeded by Ooni Lugbade.

References

Oonis of Ife
Yoruba history